Captain Francis Blake Delaval (27 December 1692 – 9 December 1752) was a Royal Navy officer and Member of Parliament.

He was the son of Edward Delaval (related to the Delaval baronets) and his wife Mary, daughter of Sir Francis Blake of Cogges (related to the Blake baronets). He inherited Seaton Delaval Hall from his uncle Admiral George Delaval, and Ford Castle from his mother's family. He represented Northumberland in Parliament from 1716 to 1722.

In August 1724 he married Rhoda Apreece, heiress of Doddington Hall, Lincolnshire; they had eleven children. He was father of Sir Francis Blake Delaval, John Hussey Delaval, 1st Baron Delaval, and Edward Hussey Delaval. His daughter Rhoda Delaval married Sir Edward Astley of Melton Constable; through her Seaton Delaval passed to the Astley family (later Baron Hastings) through her son Jacob. Another daughter Anne married William Stanhope, MP. A third daughter, Sarah, married John Savile, 1st Earl of Mexborough.

On 9 December 1752, Captain Delaval fell down the steps of the South Portico of Seaton Delaval Hall, and died of his injuries. His uncle, George Delaval, from whom he inherited the Hall, also died from a fall on the estate; he fell from his horse.

References

 
 Francis Delaval via the History of Parliament Online

1692 births
1752 deaths
English politicians
Royal Navy officers
Members of the Parliament of Great Britain for English constituencies
British MPs 1715–1722
People from Seaton Delaval
Military personnel from Northumberland